Becca Mancari (//) is an American indie folk musician from Staten Island, New York, now based in Nashville, Tennessee. Mancari is a member of the band Bermuda Triangle alongside Brittany Howard of Alabama Shakes and Jesse Lafser. Mancari has released two solo albums, Good Woman and The Greatest Part.

Career
Mancari released her debut solo album, Good Woman, on October 6, 2017.

Good Woman is listed at number 19 on Rolling Stone's "40 Best Country and Americana Albums of 2017". The album is featured on BrooklynVegan's list titled "Five Overlooked Albums of 2017".

Mancari's second solo album, The Greatest Part, was released on June 26, 2020.

Personal life
Mancari identifies as non-binary, and uses she/they pronouns.

Discography

Studio albums
 Good Woman (2017)
 The Greatest Part (2020)

References

External links 
 Official Website

Year of birth missing (living people)
Living people
Non-binary musicians
American folk musicians